Sheila Kathleen McCullagh MBE (3 December 1920 – 7 July 2014) was a British author of children's literature.

Biography

McCullagh was born in Surrey, her work was first published in the 1950s. She went on to write many children's fantasy and educational books, the Puddle Lane series being among the most popular and successful. A television adaptation of the book series starred and featured original music by Neil Innes.

McCullagh spent many years lecturing in Canada and travelled to most corners of the globe. She was also a devout Anglican.

After many years in Cornwall and then retirement in Bath, McCullagh moved to a care facility in Wiltshire. Her health had been in decline for some years. She died on 7 July 2014 in Bradford-on-Avon, Wiltshire, aged 93.

Books 
Dragon Pirate Stories
Griffin Pirate Stories
Puddle Lane
The Village with Three Corners (or One Two Three and Away)
Tim and the Hidden People (series)
Hummingbirds
Seahawk
Buccaneers (series) - illustrated by Derek Collard
Adventures in Space
Little Dragons

Television 
Puddle Lane

References

External links 

The Story People characters from The Village with Three Corners (also known as 1,2,3 and Away!) such as Roger Red-hat, Billy Blue-hat, Johnny and Jennifer Yellow-hat are being used in the I Can Read Without You (ICRWY) Project from The Reading Hut Ltd as 'transition readers' - to bridge the gap between reading 'decodable readers' and 'authentic texts'. A limited series is being published by The Reading Hut Ltd, current copyright holders.  123andAway.com

1920 births
2014 deaths
English children's writers